Mpohor/Wassa East District is a former district that was located in Western Region, Ghana. Originally created as an ordinary district assembly in 1988, which was created from the former Wassa-Fiase-Mpohor District Council. However, on 28 June 2012, it was split off into two new districts: Wassa East District (capital: Daboase) and Mpohor District (capital: Mpohor). The municipality was located in the eastern part of Western Region and had Daboase as its capital town.

References

Districts of the Western Region (Ghana)